Jeffery Tow-Arnett (born November 19, 1986) is an American football fullback who is currently a free agent. He played college football at Minnesota where he was a Center. He was signed as an undrafted free agent by the Milwaukee Mustangs in 2011. Jeffery co-owns Golden Gate Equestrian Center in Jordan Minnesota.

Professional career

Tampa Bay Buccaneers
After going undrafted during the 2010 NFL Draft, Tow-Arnett was signed by the Tampa Bay Buccaneers. Tow-Arnett failed to make the Buccaneers final roster.

Milwaukee Mustangs
In 2011, Tow-Arnett signed with the Milwaukee Mustangs of the Arena Football League. He transitioned into a fullback from his natural center position. Tow-Arnett played with the Mustangs again in 2012.

Tampa Bay Storm
In 2013, Tow-Arnett played for the Tampa Bay Storm.

Los Angeles Kiss
On October 24, 2013, Tow-Arnett was assigned to the Los Angeles Kiss.

References

External links
 Arena Football League bio 

1986 births
Living people
American football fullbacks
American football centers
Minnesota Golden Gophers football players
Milwaukee Mustangs (2009–2012) players
Tampa Bay Storm players
Los Angeles Kiss players
Cleveland Gladiators players
Players of American football from Minnesota